Halsnøya (locally called Halsne) is an island in Stavanger municipality in Rogaland county, Norway. The  island is the largest island in of the Fisterøyene archipelago. Halsnøya is located south of the island of Ombo, southeast of the Sjernarøyane islands, east of the island of Finnøy, northeast of the island of Fogn, and west of the island of Randøy. The island is only accessible by boat, with regular ferry service from the nearby islands and to the mainland.

The island is hilly with some forest, where there are deer and pine marten. The bird life is rich, including a large grey heron colony. The rest of the island is cultivated for farming or pasture land.

See also
List of islands of Norway

References

Islands of Stavanger